Azerbaijan participated in the Eurovision Song Contest 2018 with the song "X My Heart" written by Dimitris Kontopoulos and Sandra Bjurman. The song was performed by Aisel, who was internally selected by the Azerbaijani broadcaster İctimai Television (İTV) to represent the nation at the 2018 contest in Lisbon, Portugal. Aisel's selection as the Azerbaijani Eurovision entrant was announced on 8 November 2017, while the song "X My Heart" was presented to the public on 4 March 2018.

Azerbaijan was drawn to compete in the first semi-final of the Eurovision Song Contest which took place on 8 May 2018. Performing as the opening entry for the show in position 1, "X My Heart" was not announced among the top 10 entries of the first semi-final and therefore did not qualify to compete in the final. This marked the first time that Azerbaijan failed to qualify to the final of the Eurovision Song Contest from a semi-final since its first entry in 2008. It was later revealed that Azerbaijan placed eleventh out of the 18 participating countries in the semi-final with 94 points.

Background 

Prior to the 2018 contest, Azerbaijan had participated in the Eurovision Song Contest ten times since its first entry in 2008. Azerbaijan had won the contest on one occasion in 2011 with the song "Running Scared" performed by Ell and Nikki. Since their debut in 2008, Azerbaijan has had a string of successful results, qualifying to the final and placing in the top ten each year until 2014, including a third-place result in 2009 with the song "Always" performed by AySel and Arash and a second-place result in 2013 with the song "Hold Me" performed by Farid Mammadov. However, in 2014, Azerbaijan achieved their lowest placing in the contest to this point, placing 22nd in the final with the song "Start a Fire" performed by Dilara Kazimova. In 2017, Azerbaijan placed fourteenth with the song "Skeletons" performed by Dihaj.

The Azerbaijani national broadcaster, İctimai Television (İTV), broadcasts the event within Azerbaijan and organises the selection process for the nation's entry. İTV confirmed their intentions to participate at the 2018 Eurovision Song Contest on 11 August 2017. Azerbaijan had used various methods to select the Azerbaijani entry in the past, including internal selections of both the artist and song, as well as national finals to select their artist followed by an internal selection to determine the song. Between 2011 and 2013, Azerbaijan organized a national final titled Milli Seçim Turu to select the performer, song or both for Eurovision. In 2014, the broadcaster utilised an existing talent show format titled Böyük Səhnə where the winning performer would subsequently be given an internally selected song. Since 2015, the broadcaster internally selected both the artist and song that represented Azerbaijan, a procedure which continued for the selection of their 2018 entry.

Before Eurovision

Internal selection 
Both the artist and song that represented Azerbaijan at the Eurovision Song Contest 2018 was selected internally by İTV. On 8 November 2017, the broadcaster announced that a national jury panel had selected Aisel as the Azerbaijani Eurovision contestant. On 3 March 2018, İTV announced that Aisel would be performing the song "X My Heart". The selection of the song was based on the decision of İTV and participants of an opinion survey that featured 300 music and television industry experts as well as Eurovision fans from 31 European countries; "X My Heart" received the most positive votes among three shortlisted entries with 87%. "X My Heart" was written by Dimitris Kontopoulos and Sandra Bjurman, and was presented on 4 March 2018 via the streaming service provider Spotify. The official music video was later released on 7 March 2018. In regards to the song, Aisel stated: "I feel a strong connection with the lyrics of the song, since believing in myself made me overcome several difficulties I had in my life. This is a message I want to send to everyone: believing in yourself can make you stronger than cannonballs."

Promotion 
Aisel made several appearances across Europe to specifically promote "X My Heart" as the Azerbaijani Eurovision entry. On 7 April, Aisel performed during the Eurovision Pre-Party, which was held at the VEGAS Kuntsevo shopping mall in Moscow, Russia. Between 8 and 11 April, Aisel took part in promotional activities in Tel Aviv, Israel and performed during the Israel Calling event held at the Rabin Square. On 18 April, Aisel performed "X My Heart" during the bTV talk show programme Slavi's Show in Bulgaria.

At Eurovision 
According to Eurovision rules, all nations with the exceptions of the host country and the "Big Five" (France, Germany, Italy, Spain and the United Kingdom) are required to qualify from one of two semi-finals in order to compete for the final; the top ten countries from each semi-final progress to the final. The European Broadcasting Union (EBU) split up the competing countries into six different pots based on voting patterns from previous contests, with countries with favourable voting histories put into the same pot. On 29 January 2018, a special allocation draw was held which placed each country into one of the two semi-finals, as well as which half of the show they would perform in. Azerbaijan was placed into the first semi-final, to be held on 8 May 2018, and was scheduled to perform in the first half of the show.

Once all the competing songs for the 2018 contest had been released, the running order for the semi-finals was decided by the shows' producers rather than through another draw, so that similar songs were not placed next to each other. Azerbaijan was set to open the show and perform in position 1, before the entry from Iceland.

The two semi-finals and final were broadcast in Azerbaijan on İTV with commentary by Azer Suleymanli. The Azerbaijani spokesperson, who announced the top 12-point score awarded by the Azerbaijani jury during the final, was Tural Asadov.

Semi-final

Aisel took part in technical rehearsals on 29 April and 3 May, followed by dress rehearsals on 7 and 8 May. This included the jury show on 7 May where the professional juries of each country watched and voted on the competing entries.

The Azerbaijani performance featured Aisel performing with four backing vocalists/dancers, all dressed in white. The performance featured Aisel moving around triangular slabs that light up in white LEDs as well as the use of smoke effects and augmented reality that displayed a glittery effect. The performance was directed by Fokas Evagelinos. The four backing vocalists/dancers that joined Aisel on stage were Hugo Baptista, Rui Andrade, Salomé Caldeira and Sandra d'Andrade. An additional off-stage backing vocalist, Stefania Rizou, was also part of the performance.

At the end of the show, Azerbaijan was not announced among the top 10 entries in the first semi-final and therefore failed to qualify to compete in the final. This marked the first time that Azerbaijani failed to qualify to the final of the Eurovision Song Contest from a semi-final since its first entry in 2008. It was later revealed that Azerbaijan placed eleventh in the semi-final, receiving a total of 94 points: 47 points from both the televoting and the juries.

Voting
Voting during the three shows involved each country awarding two sets of points from 1-8, 10 and 12: one from their professional jury and the other from televoting. Each nation's jury consisted of five music industry professionals who are citizens of the country they represent, with their names published before the contest to ensure transparency. This jury judged each entry based on: vocal capacity; the stage performance; the song's composition and originality; and the overall impression by the act. In addition, no member of a national jury was permitted to be related in any way to any of the competing acts in such a way that they cannot vote impartially and independently. The individual rankings of each jury member as well as the nation's televoting results were released shortly after the grand final.

Below is a breakdown of points awarded to Azerbaijan and awarded by Azerbaijan in the first semi-final and grand final of the contest, and the breakdown of the jury voting and televoting conducted during the two shows:

Points awarded to Azerbaijan

Points awarded by Azerbaijan

Detailed voting results
The following members comprised the Azerbaijani jury:
  (jury chairperson)singer
 Faig Aghayevsinger
 young soloist of the Azerbaijan State Academic Opera and Ballet Theater, soprano
 Tunzala Gahramanjazz singer
 TV presenter

References 

2018
Countries in the Eurovision Song Contest 2018
Eurovision